The Chicago Seven, originally Chicago Eight, were a group of American protesters against the Vietnam war.

Chicago Seven may also refer to:

 Chicago Seven (architects), a group of postmodern architects
 Chicago VII, a 1974 album by American rock band Chicago

See also
 The Trial of the Chicago 7, a 2020 American historical legal drama film about the Chicago Seven